Stereognosis (also known as haptic perception or tactile gnosis) is the ability to perceive and recognize the form of an object in the absence of visual and auditory information, by using tactile information to provide cues from texture, size, spatial properties, and temperature, etc. In humans, this sense, along with tactile spatial acuity, vibration perception, texture discrimination and proprioception, is mediated by the dorsal column-medial lemniscus pathway of the central nervous system.  Stereognosis tests determine whether or not the parietal lobe of the brain is intact. Typically, these tests involved having the patient identify common objects (e.g. keys, comb, safety pins) placed in their hand without any visual cues.
Stereognosis is a higher cerebral associative cortical function.

Astereognosis is the failure to identify or recognize objects by palpation in the absence of visual or auditory information, even though tactile, proprioceptive, and thermal sensations may be unaffected. It may be caused by disease of the sensory cortex or posterior columns. People suffering from Alzheimer's disease show a reduction in stereognosis. Astereognosis can be caused by damage to the posterior association areas of the parietal, temporal, or occipital lobes, or the postcentral gyrus of either hemisphere. For other types of dementia, stereognosis does not appear to decline.

Mechanism of neural pathway

The dorsal column medial lemniscus pathway is responsible for relaying sensory information regarding proprioception, vibration, and fine touch. First order neurons carry sensory information from proprioceptive and tactile receptors to the medulla oblongata where they synapse in either the medullary gracilus or cuneate nuclei. Information carried from regions above spinal level T6 synapse at the cuneate nuclei, while information carried from T6 and below synapse at the gracilus nuclei. At this point, second order neurons decussate and relay information through the contralateral medial lemniscus to the thalamus. At the thalamus, second order neurons synapse with third order neurons, which continue through the internal capsule to the primary sensory cortex of the post central gyrus where the tract terminates. Stereognosis determines whether or not this tract is properly functioning. 

An individual who cannot properly identify an object using stereognosis, could suffer from lesions in nerve roots, peripheral nerves, the spinal cord, thalamus, or primary sensory cortex. Because the dorsal column medial lemniscus pathway travels through and relays information to these areas, a lack of proper sensation indicates a problem with this neural sensory tract. Administered tests and recognition of pattern sensory loss can identify lesions in particular nerves or areas.

References

Neuroscience